George Anthony Somers (October 5, 1915 – January 12, 1964) was an American football offensive tackle and kicker.  He is one of only two La Salle Explorers to enter the National Football League and the only one selected in the NFL Draft.  Before playing for the Philadelphia Eagles and Pittsburgh Steelers, Somers was a star at La Salle University – captaining the 1938 team.  Somers also received the Maxwell Club Award as best tackle in district, Associated Press (AP) and Collier's Little All-America tackle in 1938, AP All-Pennsylvania, and AP All-Eastern Honorable Mention.

References

1915 births
1964 deaths
People from Schuylkill County, Pennsylvania
American football offensive tackles
American football placekickers
La Salle Explorers football players
Philadelphia Eagles players
Pittsburgh Steelers players
Players of American football from Pennsylvania